Wolf Peter Rilla (16 March 1920 – 19 October 2005) was a film director and writer of German background, although he worked mainly in the United Kingdom.

Rilla is known for directing Village of the Damned (1960). He wrote many books for students, such as The Writer and the Screen: On Writing for Film and Television and The A to Z of Movie Making.

Early life and career
Rilla was born in Berlin, where his father Walter Rilla was an actor and producer. In common with many others in entertainment and the arts, Walter recognised the dangers when Hitler came to power, and the family moved to London in 1934 when Wolf was 14. He completed his schooling at the enlightened co-educational Frensham Heights School, Surrey, and went on to St Catharine's College, Cambridge. In 1942, he joined the BBC External Service's German section, beginning as a script editor, but transferred to television in the late 1940s.

Film and television career
Rilla left the BBC staff in 1952 to pursue a career making films, but continued to take on television productions as a freelance. For television, he directed episodes of series such as The Adventures of Aggie, a sitcom, and The Adventures of the Scarlet Pimpernel (both 1956), both produced for ITV, but also aimed at the American market. Later, he wrote episodes of the Paul Temple television series.

Meanwhile, in the cinema he worked for Group 3, a production company set up by the National Film Finance Corporation with Michael Balcon, John Baxter and John Grierson in charge. The intention was to give young talent a chance to make modestly budgeted films (those costing less than £50,000), but the arrangement only survived until 1956. By 1960, Rilla was working regularly for MGM-British Studios.

His best remembered film, Village of the Damned (1960), dates from his period with the American studio's British subsidiary. Derived from John Wyndham's sci-fi novel The Midwich Cuckoos. As well as directing the film, Rilla collaborated with producer Ronald Kinnoch (using the pseudonym George Barclay) and Stirling Silliphant on the adaptation. George Sanders co-starred with Barbara Shelley. In his other film for MGM-British, Rilla directed his father, along with George Sanders and Richard Johnson, in Cairo (1963), a remake of John Huston's The Asphalt Jungle, with Tutankhamun's jewels in a Cairo museum now the target of the robbers.

His novels included Greek Chorus, The Dispensable Man, The Chinese Consortium and one simply entitled Movie.

Rilla also wrote an episode of Doomwatch entitled The Devil's Demolition  however the series was cancelled before it was produced.

Personal life
Rilla married the actress and director Valerie Hanson after they appeared together in a BBC television production of The Portugal Lady; the couple had a daughter, Madeleine, in 1955. In 1967, he married Shirley Graham-Ellis, a publicist for tea suppliers Jacksons of Piccadilly and London Films. Rilla and Graham-Ellis had a son, Nico, who has been a filmmaker and chef. His daughter Madeline died in a car crash in 1985.

After Rilla had held office in both the film technicians' union ACTT and the Directors' Guild, he and Shirley moved to the south of France, to buy and run a hotel at Fayence in Provence.

Filmography
 Noose for a Lady (1953)
 Glad Tidings (1953)
 The Large Rope (1953)
 Marilyn (US: Roadhouse Girl, 1953)
 The Black Rider (1954)
 The End of the Road (1954)
 Stock Car (1955)
 The Blue Peter (1955)
 Pacific Destiny (1956)
 The Scamp (1957)
 Bachelor of Hearts (1958)
 Jessy (1959)
 Witness in the Dark (1959)
 Die zornigen jungen Männer (1960)
 Village of the Damned (1960)
 Piccadilly Third Stop (1960)
 Watch it, Sailor! (1961)
 The World Ten Times Over (1963)
 Cairo (1963)
 Pax? (1968)
 Secrets of a Door-to-Door Salesman (1973)
 Bedtime with Rosie (1974)

Reference

External links

Amazon page showing works including books he wrote
 

1920 births
2005 deaths
People educated at Frensham Heights School
People from Charlottenburg
Jewish emigrants from Nazi Germany to the United Kingdom
Writers from London
Film directors from London
Alumni of St Catharine's College, Cambridge